Nicola Paglia (1197 - 16 February 1256) was an Italian Roman Catholic priest and a professed member of the Order of Preachers. Paglia became a Dominican after hearing Dominic of Osma preach in Bologna and exhibited exceptional pastoral zeal in his duties which included being appointed as provincial of the Roman branch of Dominicans.

Paglia had popular devotion that endured in the centuries after his death and the confirmation of this devotion - or 'cultus' - allowed for Pope Leo XII to confirm the late priest's beatification on 26 March 1828.

Life
Nicola Paglia was born in 1197 in Giovinazzo near Bari in Apulia to nobles. He was noted as being pious and studious in his childhood. In his childhood an angel appeared to him and ordered that he forever abstain from eating meat.

In 1217 he travelled to Bologna for the completion of his education where he heard Dominic of Osma preach. Paglia was so moved from Dominic's sermon that as soon as Dominic exited the pulpit he rushed over and asked him for immediate admission into the Order of Preachers where he would later be ordained to the priesthood; he received his habit from Dominic himself. Paglia - during his period of novitiate - exhibited an exceptional determination to make great progress in his spiritual life towards God and was known to convert Jewish people to the Christian faith. Paglia served two terms as provincial of the order's Roman province and he founded convents in Perugia where he settled in. Pope Gregory IX also commissioned him to visit several monasteries and to preach a crusade against the Saracens.

Near the end of his life he obtained permission to fade from his public and active pastoral career to dedicate his time to preparation for his approaching death. Paglia died at the beginning of 1256. He was interred in the church of San Domenico in Perugia where he had died.

Beatification
The confirmation of the late priest's local 'cultus' - or popular devotion - allowed for Pope Leo XII to approve of Paglia's beatification on 26 March 1828.

References

External links
Catholic Online

1197 births
1256 deaths
13th-century venerated Christians
13th-century Italian Roman Catholic priests
Italian beatified people
Beatifications by Pope Leo XII
Dominican beatified people
Italian Dominicans
People from Bari
Venerated Catholics
Venerated Dominicans